Annie Ebrel (born 1969) is a traditional Breton singer of traditional Kan ha diskan (dance songs) and Gwerz (ballads).

Background

Annie Ebrel was born in 1969 in the village of Lohuec, near Callac, Côtes-d'Armor department, part of the historic region of Cornouaille, Brittany, France, to a family of farmers.

Through her grandfather Jean Ebrel, she is the second cousin of Louise Ebrel, who is a daughter of Eugénie Goadec, one of The Goadec Sisters.

Career

In 1983, Ebrel began learning her craft with Yannick Larvor as well as singers  (Marcel Le Guilloux) and .. 

In 1989, Ebrel participated in the album Aux sources du Barzaz Breizh, which brought her to public attention.  In 1992, she performed with Voix de Bretagne, which showcased three generations of Breton artists.  In 1996, she began performing with Italian double-bassist Riccardo Del Fra.  Most often, Ebrel performs with other artists, both singers in a cappella and musicians.  However, in 1995, Ebrel released her first solo album Tre ho ti ma hini and in 2004 created the solo show Une Voice Bretonne (A Breton Voice).

In 2012, Ebrel performed with the Annie Ebrel Quartet including Pierrick Hardy, Olivier Ker Ourio, and Bijan Chemirani.

In 2013, Ebrel celebrated her career of three decades with a performance in Saint-Nicodème, resulting in an album 30 ans de chant.

Festivals where Ebrel performed including the Vieilles Charrues Festival (1999), Festival de Cornouaille (2014), and Fest Noz (2015).

In 2018, Ebrel performs twice on the BBC Alba Port episode on Brittany, singing the Gwerz (ballad) "Robardig," accompanied by Mischa MacPherson as well as hosts Julie Fowlis and Muireann Nic Amhlaoibh, and then "Une dispute" (An Argument) as second voice to Erik Marchand.

Ebrel continues to perform, mostly in Brittany, France, Celtic areas like Scotland,  as well as Spain, Italy, Scandinavia, Canada, and the USA.

Ebrel is the subject of "Annie Ebrel, ou «une chanteuse traditionnelle bretonne»?" by François Picard of the Sorbonne University.

Works

Albums (solo)
 1995 : Chants en breton, (Coop Breizh)
 1996 : Tre ho ti ha ma hini, (Coop Breizh)
 1996 : Dibenn (An Naër Production)
 1998 : Voulouz loar... Velluto di luna (Coop Breizh)
 2013 : 30 ans de chant
 2021 : Lellig (Coop Breizh)

Albums (Annie Ebrel Quartet)
 2008 : Roudennoù (Coop Breizh)

Albums (collaborations)
 Christian Duro Soner Fisel
 1989 : Sources du Barzaz Breiz aujourd'hui
 1993 : Voix de Bretagne  (France 3, Le Quartz Brest)
 1994 : 
 Quand les bretons passent à table
 Just a Traveller with Youenn Gwernig
 1995 : Kleg Live
 1997 : Kan Ha Diskan with Yann-Fañch Kemener (Coop Breizh)
 1998 : Voulouz Loar/Velluto di luna, gant Riccardo Del Fra (Coop Breizh)
 2000 : Er roue Stevan (gant Roland Becker)
 2003 : Ephemera (gant Jacques Pellen)
 2004 : Un devezh ba kerch Morvan (gant Marcel Le Guilloux) (Coop Breizh)
 2012 : 
 Tost ha pell with Lots Join (Coop Breizh)
 Teir  with Nolùen Le Buhé and Marthe Vassallo (Coop Breizh)
 2018 : Paotred with Nolùen Le Buhé and Marthe Vassallo (Coop Breizh)

See also
 Louise Ebrel
 The Goadec Sisters
 Coop Breizh
 Kan ha diskan
 Gwerz
 Music of Brittany
 Breton language
 Riccardo Del Fra

References

External links
 BBC Alba "Port" - "Robardig"
 BBC Alba "Port" - "Robardig" (RealPlayer)
 Annie Ebrel - Vidêos et Press écrite
 Annie Ebrel (Discographie)
 La Musique Bretonne contemporaine
 Musiques en Bretagne

1969 births
Living people
People from Côtes-d'Armor
Breton-language singers